This is a list of notable buildings of the Benevolent and Protective Order of Elks, the American fraternal organization also known as the Elks or B.P.O.E., and of Elks of Canada, its counterpart.  There are many meeting hall buildings of the Elks that are prominent in small towns and in cities in the United States;  a number of these are listed on the U.S. National Register of Historic Places (NRHP program).  There are many hundreds of buildings that have limited association with Elks;  this list is intended to cover only the most prominent ones, including all that are listed on any historic registry.

There is wide variety in the architecture of these buildings. Classical Revival architecture, Renaissance Revival and other revival styles are well represented among the NRHP-listed ones.  More mundane, vernacular architecture, or in buildings less than 50 years old, is less likely to be preserved and recognized in the NRHP program.

A number of historic Elks buildings include pedimental sculpture, such as the 1916 Elks Temple of Tacoma, Washington.

Canada
Elks National Office, Regina, Saskatchewan, headquarters of Elks of Canada

United States

KEY

References

 
Buildings
Elks